Prince William Augustus, Duke of Cumberland  (15 April 1721 [N.S.] – 31 October 1765), was the third and youngest son of King George II of Great Britain and Ireland and his wife,
Caroline of Ansbach. He was Duke of Cumberland from 1726. He is best remembered for his role in putting down the Jacobite Rising at the Battle of Culloden in 1746, which made him immensely popular throughout parts of Britain. He is often referred to by the nickname given to him by his Tory opponents: 'Butcher' Cumberland. 

For much of the War of the Austrian Succession, with the assistance of John Ligonier, Cumberland commanded the main allied field army in Flanders acting in defence of the Austrian Netherlands and the Dutch Republic. At the head of the largest deployment of British troops on the continent since the days of  Marlborough and opposed to the experienced French Marshal Maurice de Saxe, Cumberland's campaigning could not prevent the fall of the Dutch Barrier Forts. Between 1748 and 1755 he attempted to enact a series of army reforms that were resisted by the opposition and by the army itself. Following the Convention of Klosterzeven in 1757, he never again held active military command and switched his attentions to politics and horse racing.

Early life

William was born in Leicester House, in Leicester Fields (now Leicester Square), Westminster, London, where his parents had moved after his grandfather, George I, accepted the invitation to ascend the British throne. His godparents included the King and Queen in Prussia (his paternal aunt), but they apparently did not take part in person and were presumably represented by proxy. On 27 July 1726, at only five years old, he was created Duke of Cumberland, Marquess of Berkhamstead in the County of Hertford, Earl of Kennington in the County of Surrey, Viscount of Trematon in the County of Cornwall, and Baron of the Isle of Alderney.

The young prince was educated well; his mother appointed Edmond Halley as a tutor. Another of his tutors (and occasional proxy for him) was his mother's favourite Andrew Fountaine. At Hampton Court Palace, apartments were designed specially for him by William Kent.

William's elder brother Frederick, Prince of Wales, proposed dividing the king's dominions. Frederick would get Britain, while William would get Hanover. This proposal came to nothing.

Early military career
From childhood, he showed physical courage and ability, and became his parents' favourite. He was enrolled in the 2nd Foot Guards and made a Knight of the Bath aged four. He was intended, by the King and Queen, for the office of Lord High Admiral, and, in 1740, he sailed, as a volunteer, in the fleet under the command of Sir John Norris, but he quickly became dissatisfied with the Navy, and, instead secured the post of colonel of the First Regiment of Foot Guards on 20 February 1741.

War of the Austrian Succession
In December 1742, he became a major-general, and, the following year, he first saw active service in Germany. George II and the "martial boy" shared in the glory of the Battle of Dettingen (27 June 1743), where Cumberland was wounded in his right leg by a musket ball. After the battle he was made a lieutenant general.

In 1745, Cumberland was given the honorary title of Captain-General of the British land forces and in Flanders became Commander-in-Chief of the allied British, Hanoverian, Austrian and Dutch (known as the Pragmatic Army) troops despite his inexperience. He initially planned to take the offensive against the French, in a move he hoped would lead to the capture of Paris, but was persuaded by his advisors that this was impossible given the vast numerical superiority of the enemy.

As it became clear that the French intention was to take Tournai, Cumberland advanced to the relief of the town, which was besieged by Marshal Saxe. In the resulting Battle of Fontenoy on 11 May 1745, the Allies were defeated by the French. Saxe had picked the battleground on which to confront the British, and filled the nearby woods with French marksmen. Cumberland ignored the threat of the woods when drawing up his battle plans, and instead concentrated on seizing the town of Fontenoy and attacking the main French army nearby.

Despite a concerted Anglo-Hanoverian attack on the French centre, which led many to believe the Allies had won, the failure to clear the woods and of the Dutch forces to capture Fontenoy forced Cumberland to retreat to Brussels, where he was unable to prevent the fall of Ghent, Bruges and Ostend. Cumberland was frequently criticised for his tactics in the battle, particularly his failure to occupy the woods.

Jacobite rebellion – "The Forty-Five"

As the leading British general of the day, he was chosen to put a decisive stop to Prince Charles Edward Stuart, a direct descendant of James VII of Scotland and II of England (James VII/II was the last Stuart king on the male line), in the Jacobite rising of 1745. His appointment was popular, and caused morale to soar amongst the public and troops loyal to King George.

Recalled from Flanders, Cumberland proceeded with preparations for quelling the Stuart (Jacobite) uprising. The Jacobite army had advanced southwards into England, hoping that English Jacobites would rise and join them. However, after receiving only limited support such as the Manchester Regiment, the followers of Charles decided to withdraw to Scotland.

Cumberland joined the Midland army under Ligonier, and began pursuit of the enemy, as the Stuarts retreated northwards from Derby. On reaching Penrith, the advanced portion of his army was repulsed on Clifton Moor in December 1745, and Cumberland became aware that an attempt to overtake the retreating Highlanders would be hopeless. Carlisle was retaken, and he was recalled to London, where preparations were in hand to meet an expected French invasion. The defeat of his replacement as commander, Henry Hawley, roused the fears of the English people in January 1746, when, under a hail of pistol fire, "eighty dragoons fell dead upon the spot" at Falkirk Muir.

Culloden

Arriving in Edinburgh on 30 January 1746, he at once proceeded in search of Charles. He made a detour to Aberdeen, where he spent some time training the well-equipped forces now under his command for the next stage of the conflict in which they were about to engage.

On 8 April 1746, he set out from Aberdeen for Inverness, and, on 16 April, he fought the decisive Battle of Culloden, in which the Stuart forces were completely destroyed. Cumberland ordered his troops to show no quarter against any remaining Jacobite rebels (French Army personnel, including those who were British-or Irish-born, were treated as legitimate combatants). His troops traversed the battlefield and stabbed any of the rebel soldiers who were still alive. When Cumberland learned that a wounded soldier lying at his feet belonged to the opposing cause, he instructed a major to shoot him; when the major (James Wolfe) refused to do so, Cumberland commanded a private to complete the required duty.

The British Army then embarked upon the so-called 'pacification' of Jacobite areas of the Highlands. All those of the troops believed to be 'rebels' were killed, as were non-combatants; 'rebellious' settlements were burned and livestock was confiscated on a large scale. Over a hundred Jacobites were hanged. Women were imprisoned, and droves of people were sent by ship to London for trial; as the journey took up to 8 months, many of them died on the way.

"Butcher Cumberland"
Following Culloden, Cumberland was nicknamed "Sweet William" by his Whig supporters and "The Butcher" by his Tory opponents the latter being a taunt first recorded in the City of London and used for political purposes in England. Cumberland's own brother, the Prince of Wales (who had been refused permission to take a military role on his father's behalf), seems to have encouraged the virulent attacks upon the Duke. Cumberland preserved the strictest discipline in his camp. He was inflexible in the execution of what he deemed to be his duty, without favour to any man. In only a few cases he exercised his influence in favour of clemency. The Duke's victorious efforts were acknowledged by his being voted an income of £25,000 per annum over and above his money from the civil list. A thanksgiving service was held at St Paul's Cathedral, that included the first performance of Handel's oratorio Judas Maccabaeus, composed especially for Cumberland, which contains the anthem "See the Conquering Hero Comes".

Return to the Continent

The Duke took no part in the Flanders campaign of 1746, during which the French made huge advances capturing Brussels and defeating the Allies at Rocoux. In 1747, Cumberland returned to the Continent and he again opposed the still-victorious Marshal Saxe and received a heavy defeat at the Battle of Lauffeld, or Val, near Maastricht, on 2 July 1747. This and the fall of Bergen-op-Zoom compelled the two sides to the negotiating table and in 1748 the Peace of Aix-la-Chapelle was concluded and Cumberland returned home.

Peacetime

Cumberland's unpopularity, which had steadily increased since Culloden, interfered greatly with his success in politics, and when the death of the Prince of Wales brought the latter's son, a minor, next in succession to the throne, the Duke was not able to secure for himself the contingent regency. As a compromise, the regency was vested in the Dowager Princess of Wales, who considered him an enemy, but her powers were curtailed and she was to be advised by a committee of twelve men, headed by Cumberland.

Attempts at army reform
Whilst in the office of Commander-in-Chief Cumberland attempted to reform the peacetime army with the support of his father. He wished to wrest control over promotions from the government to the army itself and to limit or curtail the practise of purchase. Cumberland further wished to create a special standing force which could be quickly deployed overseas in time of crisis. The Whigs who only tolerated the army's existence in peacetime and only had confidence in their control over the militia, saw the expansion and further professionalisation of the army as absolutist. Critics such as Horace Walpole argued the institution of purchase was one of the safeguards of parliamentary sovereignty against Royalist insurrection. Cumberland's opponent in government Charles Townshend wished to instead further reduce the peacetime army and reform the militia by creating a volunteer force for home defence, a precursor to the volunteers of the 19th century which would be under the direct control of civil authorities.

Seven Years' War

North America

In 1754, the simmering colonial rivalry between Britain and France over competing territorial claims in North America developed into war. France asserted its claim to Ohio Valley by building a network of powerful fortifications. The government ministry led by Newcastle initially proposed a limited military response in which a Highland regiment supported by colonial forces would drive the French from the Ohio Valley. Cumberland believed the plan was not decisive enough to protect British interests in North America and expanded the plan to include a four pronged assault against New France, with forces striking simultaneously at Duquesne, Crown Point, Niagara, and Beauséjour. Cumberland proposed that only overwhelming force would defeat France in America, which was contradictory to Newcastle's own proposals and previous government strategies which advocated limited offensive operations. Further he proposed a role of commander in chief for forces in America, who would have the power to levy local troops and direct local strategy. A 3,500 strong mixed force of regulars, militia, and allied natives would be assembled and would cross the Virginia mountains and strike Duquesne, two regiments drawn from Ireland were given this task. An officer who had impressed Cumberland on previous campaigns, Edward Braddock, was given command of all crown forces in America, to the surprise of many in the army as Braddock was relatively unknown. Newcastle approved the bolder plan, which met with limited success. In his role as army Commander-in-Chief, Cumberland advised on the conduct of the war in North America. He believed the war should be principally conducted by the colonies themselves and that regular troops should only play a supporting role. He was influential in the appointment of Loudoun, another favorite and an officer who had served in Cumberland's army during the Jacobite rebellion. Cumberland advised Loudoun to expose his officers and soldiers to scouting expeditions, so that they might "learn to beat the woods". Cumberland approved the plan to develop light infantry in the British army.

Invasion of Hanover
In 1757, the war having spread to the continent, Cumberland was placed at the head of the Hanoverian Army of Observation, intended to defend Hanover (of which George II was Elector) from a French invasion. At the Battle of Hastenbeck, near Hamelin, on 26 July 1757, Cumberland's army was defeated by the superior forces of d'Estrées. Despite seemingly having the advantage towards the end of the battle, Cumberland's forces began to retreat. Within a short time discipline had collapsed, and Cumberland's army headed northwards in total disorder. Cumberland hoped that the Royal Navy might bring him reinforcements and supplies which would allow him to regroup and counterattack, but the British mounted an expedition to Rochefort instead, despite suggestions that it should be sent to aid Cumberland.

By September 1757 Cumberland and his forces had retreated to the fortified town of Stade on the North Sea coast. The King gave him discretionary powers to negotiate a separate peace. Hemmed in by French forces led by the Duc de Richelieu, Cumberland agreed to the Convention of Klosterzeven, under which his army was to be disbanded and much of Hanover occupied by French forces, at the Zeven Convent on 8 September 1757.

On Cumberland's return to London, he was treated badly by his father, despite the fact that he had previously been given permission to negotiate such an agreement. When they met, George II remarked "Here is my son who has ruined me and disgraced himself". In response, Cumberland resigned all the military and public offices he held and retired into private life.

Final years

Cumberland's final years were lived out during the first five years of the reign of his nephew, George III, who acceded to the throne on the death of William's father on 25 October 1760. Cumberland became a very influential advisor to the King and was instrumental in establishing the First Rockingham Ministry. Cabinet meetings were held either at Cumberland Lodge, his home in Windsor, or at Upper Grosvenor Street, his house in London. Cumberland never fully recovered from his wound at Dettingen, and was obese. In August 1760, he suffered a stroke and, on 31 October 1765, he died at his home on Upper Grosvenor Street in London at age 44. He was buried beneath the floor of the nave of the Henry VII Lady Chapel in Westminster Abbey. He died unmarried.

Titles, styles, honours and arms

Titles and styles
 26 April 1721 – 27 July 1726: His Highness Prince William
 27 July 1726 – 31 October 1765: His Highness The Duke of Cumberland
The Duke's full style as proclaimed at his funeral by Garter King-of-Arms was: "the [...] most High, most Mighty, and most Illustrious Prince William Augustus, Duke of Cumberland, and Duke of Brunswick and Lunenburgh, Marquess of Berkhamstead, Earl of Kennington, Viscount Trematon, Baron of the Isle of Alderney, Knight of the most Noble Order of the Garter, and First and Principal Companion of the most Honourable Order of the Bath, third Son of His late most Excellent Majesty King George the Second".

Honours

British Honours
 KG: Knight of the Garter, 1730
 KB: Knight of the Bath, 1725
 PC: Privy Counsellor, 1742

Academic
 1751–1765: Chancellor of Trinity College, Dublin
Chancellor of King's College, Aberdeen

Arms
On 20 July 1725, as a grandchild of the sovereign, William was granted use of the arms of the realm, differenced by a label argent of five points, the centre point bearing a cross gules, the first, second, fourth and fifth each bearing a canton gules. On 30 August 1727, as a child of the sovereign, William's difference changed to a label argent of three points, the centre point bearing a cross gules.

Legacy

Prince William County, Virginia is named for him, as well as Cumberland County, Maine, Cumberland County, New Jersey, Cumberland County, North Carolina, and Cumberland County, Virginia. Various other places in the American colonies were named after him, including the Cumberland River, the Cumberland Gap and the Cumberland Mountains. In Britain, Cumberland Road in Kew and the Grade II listed Cumberland Gate into Kew Gardens are named after him.

In 2005 he was selected by the BBC History Magazine as the 18th century's worst Briton.

A memorial obelisk was erected to the Duke's military services in Windsor Great Park. It is inscribed "THIS OBELISK RAISED BY COMMAND OF KING GEORGE THE SECOND COMMEMORATES THE SERVICES OF HIS SON WILLIAM DUKE OF CUMBERLAND THE SUCCESS OF HIS ARMS AND THE GRATITUDE OF HIS FATHER THIS TABLET WAS INSCRIBED BY HIS MAJESTY KING WILLIAM THE FOURTH". According to a local park guide, the obelisk was originally inscribed "Culloden" but Queen Victoria had "Culloden" removed.

An equestrian statue of the Duke was erected in London's Cavendish Square in 1770, but was removed in 1868 since by that time the 'butcher of Culloden' was generally reviled. The original plinth remained.

Notes

References

Sources
 
 
 
 
 
 
 
 
 
 
 
 

 
 
 
 
 
 
 
 
 
 
 
 
 
 
 
 

Attribution:

Further reading

External links
 Ascanius; or, the Young Adventurer
 

1721 births
1765 deaths
Princes of Great Britain
British Army generals
301
Peers of Great Britain created by George I
House of Hanover
Knights of the Garter
British Army personnel of the Jacobite rising of 1745
British Army personnel of the War of the Austrian Succession
Grenadier Guards officers
Knights Companion of the Order of the Bath
Members of the Privy Council of Great Britain
Chancellors of the University of Dublin
Chancellors of the University of St Andrews
People from Westminster
People from Old Windsor
Burials at Westminster Abbey
British Army personnel of the Seven Years' War
English people of Scottish descent
English people of German descent
Coldstream Guards officers
British princes
Children of George II of Great Britain
Sons of kings